Viimsi JK, or simply as Viimsi, is a football club based in Haabneeme, Viimsi Parish, Estonia. They currently play in the Esiliiga, the second-highest division in the Estonian football.

History
Viimsi JK was founded in 2016, when HÜJK Emmaste, a club founded in 2000 that represented the Hiiumaa island, and Viimsi MRJK, a club which focused on youth football and was founded in 2007 by Martin Reim, merged. The new club inherited Emmaste's league spot and most senior players, while youth players, management and the stadium were provided by MRJK. 

In 2021, Viimsi JK finished first in Esiliiga B and gained promotion to Esiliiga, the second-highest division in Estonian football.

Players

Current squad
 ''As of 7 March, 2022.

Coaches

Statistics

League and Cup

References

External links
  
 Facebook page
Viimsi JK at Estonian Football Association

Football clubs in Estonia
Viimsi Parish
2000 establishments in Estonia